The Sarajevo Winter Festival  (Bosnian, Croatian and Serbian: Sarajevska zima / Сарајевска зима) is a cultural festival held annually since the winter of 1984-1985.

The “Sarajevo Winter” Festival has traditionally been held under the auspices of the Secretary General of the Council of Europe, European Union, UNESCO, The Presidency of B&H, The Federation of B&H, The Council of Ministers of B&H, Sarajevo Canton, City of Sarajevo and Stari grad Municipality.

External links
 Official Web Site

Tourist attractions in Sarajevo
Winter events in Bosnia and Herzegovina
Festivals in Sarajevo
Cultural festivals in Yugoslavia
Annual events in Bosnia and Herzegovina
1984 establishments in Yugoslavia